Khurga is a rural locality (an ulus) in Okinsky District, Republic of Buryatia, Russia. The population was 117 as of 2010. There are 10 streets.

Geography 
Khurga is located 19 km south of Orlik (the district's administrative centre) by road. Orlik is the nearest rural locality.

References 

Rural localities in Okinsky District